State Route 131 (SR 131) is a  state route in the U.S. state of Maine. Its southern terminus is in the St. George community of Port Clyde, at a dead end near the Port Clyde Harbor. Its northern terminus is in Swanville, at the intersection with SR 141.

Major junctions

References

External links

Floodgap Roadgap's RoadsAroundME: Maine State Route 131

131
Transportation in Knox County, Maine
Transportation in Waldo County, Maine